Royal Irish Regiment may be either of two British Army regiments:
Royal Irish Regiment (1684–1922), also known as the 18th Regiment of Foot
Royal Irish Regiment (1992), properly named the Royal Irish Regiment (27th (Inniskilling) 83rd and 87th and Ulster Defence Regiment)